Minor Watson (December 22, 1889 – July 28, 1965) was a prominent character actor. He appeared in 111 movies made between 1913 and 1956. His credits included Boys Town (1938), Yankee Doodle Dandy (1942), Kings Row (1942), Guadalcanal Diary (1943), Bewitched (1945), The Virginian (1946), and The Jackie Robinson Story (1950)

Early years
Watson was the son of Mrs. Alice Rodgers. He attended St. John's Northwestern Military Academy in Delafield, Wisconsin, and Shurtleff College in Alton, Illinois. He said that, as a member of Sigma Phi at Shurtleff, he was encouraged to pursue a career in drama.

Film
Watson began his film career with Essanay Studios in 1913. He was described as "the new recruit that plays lover parts."

Stage
Watson's Broadway credits include State of the Union, End of Summer, Tapestry in Gray, A Divine Drudge, Reunion in Vienna, Friendship, This Thing Called Love, These Modern Women, Howdy King, Mismates, The Magnolia Lady, and Why Men Leave Home.

Personal life
Watson married Elinor Hewitt December 7, 1919, in Boston, Massachusetts.

Death
Watson is buried in Alton Cemetery in Alton, Illinois.

Partial filmography

24 Hours (1931) as David Melbourn
Our Betters (1933) as Arthur Fenwick
Another Language (1933) as Paul Hallam
The Pursuit of Happiness (1934) as Col. Sherwood
Babbitt (1934) as Paul 'Paulivus' F. Reisling
Charlie Chan in Paris (1935) as Renard
Mister Dynamite (1935) as Clark Lewis
Mary Jane's Pa (1935) as Kenneth Marvin
Age of Indiscretion (1935) as Mr. Adams
Lady Tubbs (1935) as Edward J. Fishbaker
Pursuit (1935) as Hale
Annapolis Farewell (1935) as Cmmdre. Briggs
Rose of the Rancho (1936) as Jonathan Hill
The Longest Night (1936) as Hardy, Store Security
When's Your Birthday? (1937) as Regan
The Woman I Love (1937) as Deschamps
Dead End (1937) as Mr. Griswald
That Certain Woman (1937) as Tilden
Saturday's Heroes (1937) as Doc Thomas
Navy Blue and Gold (1937) as Lt. Milburn
Checkers (1937) as Dr. Smith
Of Human Hearts (1938) as Capt. Griggs
Love, Honor and Behave (1938) as Dr. 'Mac' MacConaghey
Fast Company (1938) as Steve Langner
Boys Town (1938) as The Bishop
Touchdown, Army (1938) as Col. Denby
Stablemates (1938) as Barney Donovan
While New York Sleeps (1938) as Charles MacFarland
Stand Up and Fight (1939) as U.S. Marshal Cole (uncredited)
The Adventures of Huckleberry Finn (1939) as Capt. Brandy
The Flying Irishman (1939) as Airline Personnel Manager (uncredited)
The Hardys Ride High (1939) as Mr. Terry B. Archer
Boy Friend (1939) as Capt. Duffy
Maisie (1939) as Prosecuting Attorney
News Is Made at Night (1939) as Charles Coulton AKA Clifford Mussey
The Angels Wash Their Faces (1939) as Maloney
Here I Am a Stranger (1939) as Evans
Television Spy (1939) as Burton Lawson
The Llano Kid (1939) as Sheriff Robert McLane
Abe Lincoln in Illinois (1940) as Joshua Speed
Viva Cisco Kid (1940) as Jesse Allen
20 Mule Team (1940) as Marshal
Hidden Gold (1940) as Ed Colby
Young People (1940) as Dakin
Rangers of Fortune (1940) as Clem Bowdry
Gallant Sons (1940) as Barton Newbold
Western Union (1941) as Pat Grogan
The Monster and the Girl (1941) as Judge Pulver
Mr. District Attorney (1941) as Arthur Barret
Moon Over Miami (1941) as Reynolds
The Parson of Panamint (1941) as Sheriff Nickerson
Kiss the Boys Goodbye (1941) as Uncle Jefferson Davis Bethany
Birth of the Blues (1941) as Henri Lambert
They Died with Their Boots On (1941) as Senator Smith
Woman of the Year (1942) as William J. Harding
Kings Row (1942) as Sam Winters
Frisco Lil (1942) as Jeff Gray
The Remarkable Andrew (1942) as District Attorney Orville Beamish
To the Shores of Tripoli (1942) as Capt. Christopher Winters
Yankee Doodle Dandy (1942) as Albee
The Big Shot (1942) as Warden George Booth
Flight Lieutenant (1942) as Maj. John Thompson (uncredited)
Enemy Agents Meet Ellery Queen (1942) as Commander Lang
Gentleman Jim (1942) as Buck Ware
Power of the Press (1943) as John Cleveland Carter (uncredited)
Mission to Moscow (1943) as Loy Henderson
Crash Dive (1943) as Adm. Bob Stewart (uncredited)
Action in the North Atlantic (1943) as Rear Adm. Williams (uncredited)
Yanks Ahoy (1943) as Capt. Scott
Princess O'Rourke (1943) as Mr. Washburn
Guadalcanal Diary (1943) as Col. Wallace E. Grayson
Happy Land (1943) as Judge Colvin
Henry Aldrich, Boy Scout (1944) as Ramsey Kent
The Falcon Out West (1944) as Dave Colby
The Story of Dr. Wassell (1944) as Frederick Gordon (uncredited)
That's My Baby! (1944) as R. P. (Phineas) Moody
Here Come the Waves (1944) as Superior Officer (uncredited)
God Is My Co-Pilot (1945) as Col. Caleb V. Haynes
A Bell for Adano (1945) as Maj. Gen. McKay (uncredited)
Bewitched (1945) as Edward - the Governor
You Came Along (1945) as Uncle Jack
Saratoga Trunk (1945) as J.P. Reynolds (uncredited)
The Thin Man Goes Home (1945) as Sam Ronson
Boys' Ranch (1946) as Mr. Harper
Courage of Lassie (1946) as Sheriff Ed Grayson
The Virginian (1947) as Mr. Carver
A Southern Yankee (1948) as Gen. Watkins
Beyond the Forest (1949) as Moose Lawson
The File on Thelma Jordon (1950) as Judge Calvin H. Blackwell
The Jackie Robinson Story (1950) as Branch Rickey
Mister 880 (1950) as Judge O'Neil
Bright Victory (1951) as Mr. Edward Paterson
Little Egypt (1951) as Harold P. Cleveland
As Young as You Feel (1951) as Cyrus Graydon
My Son John (1952) as Dr. Carver
Untamed Frontier (1952) as Matt Denbow
Face to Face (1952) as Scratchy' Wilson ("The Bride Comes to Yellow Sky")
The Star (1952) as Joe Morrison
Roar of the Crowd (1953) as Cyrus Mackey
Ten Wanted Men (1955) as Jason Carr
The Rawhide Years (1956) as Matt Comfort
Trapeze (1956) as John Ringling North
The Ambassador's Daughter (1956) as Gen. Andrew Harvey

References

External links

1889 births
1965 deaths
People from Alton, Illinois
Male actors from Arkansas
American male film actors
American male television actors
American male stage actors
20th-century American male actors
People from Marianna, Arkansas
Male Western (genre) film actors